The 22nd Empire Awards ceremony (officially known as the Jameson Empire Awards), presented by the British film magazine Empire, honored the best films of 2016. The ceremony took place on 19 March 2017 in London, England.

Winners and nominees
Winners are listed first and highlighted in boldface.

Multiple awards
The following films received multiple awards:

Multiple nominations
The following films received multiple nominations:

References

External links
 

Empire Award ceremonies
2016 film awards
2017 in London
2017 in British cinema
March 2017 events in the United Kingdom